Seisyll ap Dyfnwal was a 12th-century Welsh Lord of Gwent Uwchcoed (Upper Gwent).

Family and estates 
Seisyll was the son of Dyfnwal ap Caradog ap Ynyr Fychan and his wife, said to have been Joyce daughter of Hamelin de Balun. He was a brother-in-law of Rhys ap Gruffydd, the Lord Rhys, King of Deheubarth.

He held lands in present-day Monmouthshire, part of the old Welsh Kingdom of Gwent, and his main base was at Castell Arnallt, a motte and bailey style fortified site situated near the River Usk a few miles south of Abergavenny, near modern-day Llanover. It is today just a mound in a riverside field.

Christmas massacre 
Seisyll ap Dyfnwal is best known for being an unwitting victim of the Norman Baron, William de Braose, 4th Lord of Bramber, who had him murdered in cold blood on or very near Christmas Day 1175 at Abergavenny Castle.

Seisyll, along with all the other Welsh princes and leaders from the area, was invited to Abergavenny Castle at Christmas by William De Braose on the understanding that they could voice grievances, overcome differences and plan a period of relative peace following a period of conflict. Some Welsh leaders stayed away, mistrusting de Braose. Seisyll attended along with his eldest son Geoffrey. Most other leaders followed suit and attended, assured of peaceful intent at the castle and surrendering their arms. Once inside the walls they were cut down without mercy by armed men.

De Braose and his men then mounted horses and galloped the few miles to Seisill's home where they caught and murdered his younger son, Cadwalladr a boy of seven years of age and captured his wife, whose exact fate is uncertain.

De Braose's act was to avenge his own uncle's death. His uncle Henry FitzMiles, had been a victim of the Welsh earlier in the year. His exact killer was probably unknown but Seisyll was apparently suspected. De Braose's strategy was to eliminate all those who could have done it and effectively remove the experienced leadership of the Welsh forces in the area, destabilising the region and seize the opportunity to gain the upper hand.

The effect was to drive a massive wedge into Anglo-Welsh relations for generations to come.

Legacy
The de Braose family name was a byword for dishonourable dealing and de Braose descendants face hatred, fear and enmity from this point on. De Braose himself earned the nickname the 'Ogre of Abergavenny' for his conduct and his follow-up retribution on his enemy's families. Seisyll's death was avenged in 1182 by Hywel ap Iorwerth, the Welsh lord of Caerleon, in a campaign in which the sheriff of Hereford was killed and Abergavenny castle stormed.  De Braose's son and heir later fell from royal favor, dying in exile, and his wife and son were possibly starved to death while incarcerated at Windsor Castle and Corfe Castle in 1210.

References

1175 deaths
People from Monmouthshire
Welsh royalty
Year of birth unknown